Atayevka (Bashkir and ) is a rural locality (a village) in Ufa, Bashkortostan, Russia. The population was 101 as of 2010. There are 8 streets.

Geography 
Atayevka is located 24 km south of Ufa. Korolyovo is the nearest rural locality.

References 

Rural localities in Ufa urban okrug